Alfred Vierling (born 3 July 1949) is a Dutch politician, who was active in the 1980s in the nationalist Centre Party for which he won 135.000 votes during the European elections in 1984 and Centre Democrats and who in the 1990s co-founded the Dutch Block. In 1990, he was elected in the city council of Schiedam and since then he is active for several eurocentrist i.e. a European identity advocating groups, has written articles for various magazines and websites and has made a video interview series with far-right figures such as David Duke, Horst Mahler and Guillaume Faye.

Alfred Vierling has long been an environmentalist as well as an animal protector. He is co-founder of the Foundation Reinwater (to protect the river Rhine), the European Environmental Bureau in Brussels and was president of the Ecological Movement in the Netherlands.

He has been scientific collaborator at Leiden University (International Environmental Law), the Free University of Amsterdam (Nuclear Strategies) and UNISA, University of Pretoria (Asian Studies). Also he has been Secretary of the Dutch Inter-Ministerial Commission for Migrants from Suriname and the Dutch Antilles before he became active in the anti-immigration Centre Party/Centre Democrats.

On 12 October 1999, he submitted a complaint against 3 members of the Dutch government regarding war crimes committed by it within the framework of NATO bombings on Yugoslavia at the International Criminal Tribunal for the former Yugoslavia in The Hague.
In the Juli-September 2010 issue no 4 of Ab Aeterno (Journal of the Academy of Social & Political Research) Vierling published an article about the Netherlands in world context entitled The Netherlands, a Failed State in a Failed Continent.

Sources

1949 births
Living people
Centre Democrats (Netherlands) politicians
Gay politicians
Municipal councillors in South Holland
People from Schiedam
Dutch LGBT politicians
People from Voorburg
Academic staff of the University of Pretoria
Dutch political activists
21st-century Dutch LGBT people
LGBT conservatism